The Central District of Marand County is in East Azerbaijan province, Iran. At the National Census in 2006, its population was 201,747 in 52,369 households. The following census in 2011 counted 211,700 people in 61,505 households. At the latest census in 2016, the district had 217,093 inhabitants in 67,031 households. In 2019, Koshksaray Rural District and the city of Koshksaray were separated to form Khoshksaray District.

References 

Marand County

Districts of East Azerbaijan Province

Populated places in East Azerbaijan Province

Populated places in Marand County